Israel Amidan (born Wettenstein) (Hebrew: ישראל עמידן; April 9, 1921 – 1968) was a musician and composer.

Biography
Amidan was born in Transylvania, Romania on April 9, 1921. He was a child when his parents moved to Mandatory Palestine and participated in establishing a moshav now called Kfar Gidon or Gideon.
He taught at the Tel Aviv music academy;  violinist Yair Kless was a notable student.

Beginners' steps. 50 Hebrew songs transcribed for violin was published in 1965 

Amidan died in 1968 in Tel-Aviv, Israel.

See also
Jewish music
List of Jewish musicians
Music of Israel

References

External links
 Amidan archive 

1921 births
1968 deaths
People from Transylvania
Israeli people of Romanian-Jewish descent
20th-century Israeli male musicians
Romanian emigrants to Mandatory Palestine